Lewis Ferguson (born 24 August 1999) is a Scottish professional footballer who plays for Serie A club Bologna and the Scotland national football team as a midfielder.

After playing youth football for Rangers and Hamilton Academical, Ferguson made his senior debut for the latter club in the 2017–18 season. After four seasons with Aberdeen he moved to Italian club Bologna in 2022.

A Scotland youth international, he made his senior debut in 2021.

Club career

Hamilton
Born in Hamilton, South Lanarkshire, Ferguson is a graduate of the Hamilton Academical youth system after earlier being part of the setup at Rangers. He made his senior debut for Hamilton on 20 January 2018, and became a regular in the team in the latter part of the 2017–18 season, replacing Greg Docherty who had moved to Rangers.

With his contract due to expire at the end of that season, Ferguson signed a pre-contract agreement with Aberdeen in May 2018. He was one of seven first-team players who left Hamilton at the end of the 2017–18 season.

Aberdeen
Ferguson made his competitive debut for Aberdeen on 26 July 2018, in the first leg of a Europa League tie against Burnley at Pittodrie Stadium. He scored his first senior goal in the second leg at Turf Moor – a "stunning overhead kick" – although Burnley eventually won the tie on aggregate after extra time. On 28 October, he helped Aberdeen to reach the 2018 Scottish League Cup Final by scoring the only goal of the semi-final against Rangers at Hampden Park. By the end of the calendar year, he had also scored three league goals, all in the closing minutes of each fixture, with two of them (a free kick against Kilmarnock and another overhead kick against Livingston) winning the matches for his team.

In February 2019, Ferguson extended his contract with Aberdeen, keeping him at the club until 2024. In April, he played at Hampden Park again, but this time was sent off for a dangerous challenge as Aberdeen lost to Celtic in the semi-final of the 2018–19 Scottish Cup. In May 2019, he was nominated for the season's PFA Scotland Young Player of the Year; the award was won by Ryan Kent.

Ferguson was the club's top scorer during the 2020–21 season, with 10 goals in 41 appearances. Aberdeen rejected an offer from Watford for Ferguson in May 2021, after which he submitted a written transfer request.

Bologna 
On 12 July 2022, Italian club Bologna announced the signing of Ferguson for an undisclosed transfer fee. He made his debut as a substitute in a 2–0 away defeat to Milan on 27 August 2022, and made two more substitute appearances before his first start against Napoli on 16 October. His first goal came a week later, the second in a 2–0 win at home to Lecce, and he scored again the following week – the equaliser in a 2–1 away win over Monza. On 12 November 2022, he scored Bologna's third goal in a 3–0 win over Sassuolo, a curling effort from the edge of the penalty area after a one-two with Nicolás Domínguez that was later named the Serie A goal of the month for November 2022.

International career
Ferguson was called up by the Scotland under-19 team in August 2017, making a number of appearances for them. Ferguson received his first call-up to the senior Scotland squad in August 2021 for games against Denmark, Moldova and Austria.

He made his debut against Denmark on 1 September 2021 in a 2–0 away loss, coming on for Billy Gilmour in added time.

Personal life
Lewis is the son of Derek Ferguson and nephew of Barry Ferguson, both former professional footballers with clubs including Rangers, and the Scotland national team. His cousin Kyle Ferguson is also a footballer (they were teammates as children in the Rangers academy).

Career statistics

Honours
Individual
SFWA Young Player of the Year: 2019–20
Serie A Goal of the Month: November 2022

References

1999 births
Living people
Scottish footballers
Rangers F.C. players
Hamilton Academical F.C. players
Aberdeen F.C. players
Bologna F.C. 1909 players
Association football midfielders
Scotland youth international footballers
Scottish Professional Football League players
Scotland under-21 international footballers
Scotland international footballers
Footballers from Hamilton, South Lanarkshire
Scottish expatriate footballers
Expatriate footballers in Italy
Scottish expatriate sportspeople in Italy
Serie A players